Carlos Antônio Ferreira de Sousa  is a Brazilian footballer who plays as a defensive midfielder for Guarany de Sobral.

References

External links
Carlão at ZeroZero

1989 births
Living people
Brazilian footballers
Association football midfielders
Campeonato Brasileiro Série A players
Campeonato Brasileiro Série B players
Campeonato Brasileiro Série C players
Campeonato Brasileiro Série D players
Guarany Sporting Club players
América Futebol Clube (RN) players
Guarani FC players
Associação Desportiva Bahia de Feira players
Luverdense Esporte Clube players
Ceará Sporting Club players
Cuiabá Esporte Clube players
Atlético Clube Goianiense players
Maringá Futebol Clube players
Botafogo Futebol Clube (PB) players
Sportspeople from Fortaleza
Caucaia Esporte Clube players